Antimony trifluoride is the inorganic compound with the formula SbF3.  Sometimes called Swarts' reagent, is one of two principal fluorides of antimony, the other being SbF5. It appears as a white solid.  As well as some industrial applications, it is used as a reagent in inorganic and organofluorine chemistry.

Preparation and structure
In solid SbF3, the Sb centres have octahedral molecular geometry and are linked by bridging fluoride ligands. Three Sb–F bonds are short (192 pm) and three are long (261 pm). Because it is a polymer, SbF3 is far less volatile than related compounds AsF3 and SbCl3.

SbF3 is prepared by treating antimony trioxide with hydrogen fluoride:  
Sb2O3  +  6 HF   →   2 SbF3  +  3 H2O
The compound is a mild Lewis acid, hydrolyzing slowly in water.  With fluorine, it is oxidized to give antimony pentafluoride.
SbF3  +  F2   →   SbF5

Applications
It is used as a fluorination reagent in organic chemistry.  This application was reported by the Belgian chemist Frédéric Jean Edmond Swarts in 1892, who demonstrated its usefulness for converting chloride compounds to fluorides.  The method involved treatment with antimony trifluoride with chlorine or with antimony pentachloride to give the active species antimony trifluorodichloride (SbCl2F3). This compound can also be produced in bulk.  The Swarts reaction is generally applied to the synthesis of organofluorine compounds, but experiments have been performed using silanes.  It was once used for the industrial production of freon. Other fluorine-containing Lewis acids serve as fluorinating agents in conjunction with hydrogen fluoride.

SbF3 is used in dyeing and in pottery, to make ceramic enamels and glazes.

Safety
The lethal minimum dose (guinea pig, oral) is 100 mg/kg.

References

External links
 WebBook page for SbF3

Antimony(III) compounds
Fluorides
Metal halides
Fluorinating agents